Birkbeck may refer to:

Birkbeck (surname)
Birkbeck, University of London, a college of the University of London
Birkbeck Students' Union, a Student Union in London
Birkbeck station, a railway station and tram stop in south London
Birkbeck Stratford, the name for a project to expand the provision of part-time Higher Education in east London.
Birkbeck Court, the oldest and largest student residence at the University of Strathclyde, Scotland.
Birkbeck, Illinois, an unincorporated community in DeWitt County, Illinois, United States.